Grace McLean is an American actress, playwright, composer and singer. She is known for her roles in various off-Broadway and Broadway productions such as Natasha, Pierre & The Great Comet of 1812, Bedbugs, Alice by Heart, and In The Green, the latter of which she wrote and orchestrated. She is also known for her work as a music educator and for fronting the band Grace McLean and Them Apples.

Early life
McLean graduated from the Orange County School of the Arts in Santa Ana, California in 2002.

Career

Theatre
In 2013, McLean starred as Marya Dmitriyevna in the original Off-Broadway production in Dave Malloy's EDM-rock opera Natasha, Pierre & The Great Comet of 1812. She later reprised this role in the 2015 American Repertory Theatre and 2016 Broadway productions, as well as on both of the show's official cast recordings.

In 2017, McLean was named one of Lincoln Center's writers-in-residence, allowing her free rein of office space and materials to create original theatre works. Them Apples had previously performed in both the 2015 and 2016 Lincoln Center American Songbook series.

In 2019 McLean starred in the new Off-Broadway musical Alice by Heart based on Alice's Adventures in Wonderland as The Queen of Hearts, Red Cross Nurse, and Magpie.

Also in 2019 McLean wrote the book, music, lyrics, and orchestrations for In the Green, a new musical about the life of eleventh century abbess, christian mystic, composer, and polymath Hildegard von Bingen.  McLean also plays Jutta von Sponheim, Hildegard's mentor and fellow prisoner. 
The show opened on June 4 Off-Broadway at Lincoln Center's LCT3 Theatre and closed on August 14, 2019. The show was nominated for 6 awards at the 2020 Lucille Lortel Award including Outstanding Musical, and McLean winning for Outstanding Lead Actress in a Musical. The original cast recording was released on October 16, 2020 through Ghostlight Records.

Music
Her voice has been described as "a flexible instrument with unexpected reserves of power". She is also noted for her use of loops, creating layers of sound, turning her solo voice into a full rhythm section.

Her band, Grace McLean & Them Apples (which consists of her, Hiroyuki Matsuura, and Justin Goldner), incorporates a myriad of styles including swing, hip-hop, electronica, jazz, and musical theatre In 2015 and 2016 the band toured Russia and Pakistan as ambassadors for the U.S. State Department.

The band have released two extended plays, Make Me Breakfast in 2012 and Natural Disaster in 2016. A full-length album was announced to be forthcoming in 2019, though it remains unreleased.

She also voiced Madame Sunshine in the musical podcast The Fall of the House of Sunshine.

Theatre credits

References

External links
 
 
 
 
 

Year of birth missing (living people)
Living people
American musical theatre composers
American musical theatre actresses
American women dramatists and playwrights
21st-century American dramatists and playwrights
American musical theatre lyricists
American women singer-songwriters
Voice teachers
American singer-songwriters
21st-century American actresses